Zielony Staw Gąsienicowy is a tarn in Poland, part of the Gąsienicowe Ponds in the High Tatras. The tarn was formerly named Suczy Staw. Zielony Staw Gąsienicowy is the largest lake in the Zielona Gąsienicowa Valley.

References

Lakes of Poland
Lakes of Lesser Poland Voivodeship

Lakes of the High Tatras